is the fifteenth single by Japanese idol group Momoiro Clover Z, released on April 29, 2015. The title track is the theme song of the 2015 Dragon Ball Z: Resurrection 'F' theatrical film.

Details 
"Z no Chikai" is the theme song of the Dragon Ball Z: Fukkatsu no F anime film, which Momoiro Clover Z's members also perform in by voicing "angels from hell." The lyrics to the song were written by Yukinojo Mori and inspired by Akira Toriyama's Dragon Ball series.

The "F" Edition contains two tracks and their instrumental versions, a Blu-ray Disc of the title track's music video and has cover art depicting the group's members dressed as Dragon Ball character Freeza, while the back cover has a similar image as it would be seen through one of the series' "Scouter" devices. The "Z" Edition includes a cover of Dragon Ball Z'''s original opening theme song, "Cha-La Head-Cha-La" by Hironobu Kageyama, and an instrumental version in addition to the previous four tracks, with front and back cover art illustrations depicting the members in a Dragon Ball-style drawn by Toei Animation.

A shortened movie version of the song is included on the Dragon Ball Z: Resurrection 'F' original soundtrack released on May 8, 2015. An English-language version of the song titled "Pledge of "Z"" was recorded for use in international versions of the film. Kanako Momota admitted that the English lyrics had to be transliterated into katakana so that the members could sing them.

Momoiro Clover Z included a new version of "Z no Chikai", subtitled the "-ZZ Ver.-" and arranged by Tomoki Hasegawa, on the Limited Edition B version of their 2019 self-titled album.

Music video
The music video for "Z no Chikai" was directed by Masatsugu Nagasoe and takes its theme from the Dragon Ball'' universe with the members of Momoiro Clover Z dressed as its characters. Kanako Momota is dressed as Son Goku, Shiori Tamai as Vegeta, Ayaka Sasaki as a mix of Bulma and Trunks, Momoka Ariyasu as Chaozu, and Reni Takagi as Piccolo. All of them also dress as the villain Freeza towards the end of the video.

A short version of the video was released online on April 22, 2015, while the full version was uploaded on May 1. The single's "F" Edition includes the music video on a Blu-ray Disc.

Track listing

"F" Edition

"Z" Edition

Charts

References

External links 
 Special website for the single 
 "Z no Chikai" in Momoiro Clover Z discography

2015 singles
2015 songs
Japanese-language songs
Momoiro Clover Z songs
King Records (Japan) singles
Dragon Ball songs
Japanese film songs
Songs written for animated films
Songs written by Yukinojo Mori